Katrin Schmidt (born 21 June 1986) is a Swedish-German footballer who played as a midfielder for Djurgårdens IF of the Swedish Damallsvenskan.

Club career
Schmidt played in Germany, Canada and United States before moving to Sweden. She played for FC Rosengård from 2012 to 2014, winning a Damallsvenskan title in 2013 and a Super Cup in 2012.

When Hammarby IF DFF were relegated from the Damallsvenskan in 2015, Schmidt quit the club for their newly promoted Stockholm rivals Djurgårdens IF.

Honours

Club
Djurgårdens IF
Winner
 Damallsvenskan: 2013, 2014
 Super Cup: 2012

Runner-up
 Damallsvenskan: 2012

References

External links

 
 
 
 Player domestic stats at DFB 
 
 Profile at soccerdonna.de 
 Profile at worldfootball.net 
 

1986 births
Living people
German women's footballers
German expatriate women's footballers
Hammarby Fotboll (women) players
Tyresö FF players
FC Rosengård players
Damallsvenskan players
Expatriate women's footballers in Sweden
German expatriate sportspeople in Sweden
Djurgårdens IF Fotboll (women) players
Vancouver Whitecaps FC (women) players
Florida State Seminoles women's soccer players
Expatriate women's soccer players in the United States
German expatriate sportspeople in the United States
Women's association football midfielders
Swedish women's footballers
Sweden women's international footballers